("Works without opus number") (WoO), also Kinsky–Halm Catalogue, is a German musical catalogue prepared in 1955 by Georg Kinsky and , listing all of the compositions of Ludwig van Beethoven that were not originally published with an opus number, or survived only as fragments. The work was originally titled in German Das Werk Beethovens: Thematisch-bibliographisches Verzeichnis seiner sämtlichen vollendeten Kompositionen.

The abbreviation WoO is also used sometimes to refer to works without opus by other composers, such as Johannes Brahms, Robert Schumann, Muzio Clementi, Louis Spohr, Joachim Raff, or Ferdinand Ries.

See also
 Catalogues of Beethoven compositions
 List of compositions by Ludwig van Beethoven

References

External links
 Online listing of the WoO catalogue, some with MIDI or MP3 versions

Classical music catalogues
Ludwig van Beethoven
Acronyms